Berg en Dal may refer to:

 Berg en Dal (municipality), a municipality in the province of Gelderland, the Netherlands
 Berg en Dal (village), a village in the municipality of Berg en Dal
 Berg en Dal (Suriname), a place in Suriname
 , a villa in Baarn